Denise Deegan (born 1952) is an English novelist and playwright. She is best known for her play, Daisy Pulls It Off.

Biography 
Deegan was born in London, England, where she trained in stage management at East 15 Acting School. Prior to writing Daisy Pulls It Off (1983), she worked as a freelance stage manager. Deegan is the resident writer for the prison, HMP Featherstone, where she teaches writing to inmates.

Work 
Deegan is best known for Daisy Pulls It Off (1983), a comedy that which spoofs "schoolgirl novels" of the type written by Angela Brazil. The play was called a "pitch-perfect spoof" by The Guardian and it ran for three years in the West End theatre. Her play, The Hiring Fair, is based on a true story of events that took place at the Portfield Fair.

Playwright and critic, Michelene Wandor, identifies Deegan's plays as feminist in nature.

Bibliography
 The Project (1971).
 The One and Only Wonderous Legends Show (for EMMA Theatre Company).
 Daisy Pulls It Off (1983). 
 A Late Late Christmas Carol.
 The Midsummer Gathering
 No Birds Sing
 The Harvester's Feast
 The Hiring Fair
 Turn the Old Year Go
 Tom Jones (adaptation)
 Swallows & Amazons (co-adaptation)
 Transports of Delight
 Every Night Something Awful
 Ideal Words

References

Citations

Sources

External links
 Preview of a performance of Daisy Pulls It Off (video)

1952 births
Living people
20th-century English women writers
20th-century British novelists
Laurence Olivier Award winners
English women novelists
English women dramatists and playwrights
Alumni of East 15 Acting School